Christopher DeMargo Brown (born January 21, 1978) is a former American football offensive lineman.  He played college football for Georgia Tech and was recognized as a consensus All-American in 2000.

Brown was rated as the No. 9 offensive tackle available in the 2001 NFL Draft by Sports Illustrated, but was not chosen in the NFL Draft.

Brown was inducted to the Georgia Tech Sports Hall of Fame in 2010.

References

External links
Georgia Tech Yellow Jackets bio
Just Sports Stats

1978 births
Living people
American football offensive tackles
Georgia Tech Yellow Jackets football players
Players of American football from Augusta, Georgia
All-American college football players